The lowland streaked tenrec (Hemicentetes semispinosus) is a small tenrec found in Madagascar. It belongs to the family Tenrecidae in the order Afrosoricida, and more specifically to the subfamily of the spiny tenrecs Tenrecinae. Its natural habitats are in tropical lowland rain forests in northern and eastern parts of Madagascar.

It is very closely related to the Highland streaked tenrec.

Distribution and habitat
It can be found on land, splashing in shallow waters or digging underground.

Description

Physical appearance
This species has a black spiny pelage with yellow or chestnut-brown stripes that run the length of the body. There is a median yellow stripe that runs down the rostrum along with one dorsal and two lateral stripes that mark the length of the body and may serve as a warning to predators. Quills are present in this species being longer and more numerous on the head and nuchal area. However, the ventral region contains few to no quills but have the ability to detach in predation defense.

Unique aspects
H. semispinosus possesses sensory hairs that are scattered on the dorsum that are similar to vibrissae. It has an evolutionary adaptation for its semifossorial habits with a well developed lateral and long heads of M. triceps brachii and enlarged M. teres major that function as an extensor of the elbow joint and as an adductor of the upper arm for digging. This species also has elongated hands and second, third, and fourth digit adaptation that acts as the main fossorial adaptation. The middle of the skull of this species is long and low, the alveolar processes of the maxilla, premaxilla and mandible are reduced and the palate narrow. The teeth are small, spaced, and placed farther forward on the skull. The temporal muscles, sagittal, and nuchal crests are weaker compared to other tenrec species.

In addition, the lowland streaked tenrec has been found to have thermolability, which depends on factors such as habitat and temperature.

Population threats
These tenrecs are threatened primarily by the loss of their natural habitat due to continuous deforestation, as it is with many other animals in the Madagascar region. This species is also being hunted for food.

Behavior
In preparation for birth, a pregnant female will use her snout as a spade to clear away a depression in the ground within the burrow. The Streaked tenrec will flaunt its quails to scare away any possible predators. When forced to engage another species it will use a rough headbutt in an attempt to immobilize its target.

Diet

The lowland streaked tenrec is active both during the day and at night. Its diet is made up primarily of earthworms, but it will sometimes prey on other invertebrates as well. It may be seen stamping its feet on the ground with its fore-paws, an adaptation which is believed to increase earthworm activity for easier foraging. Most tenrecs possess a long snout for poking around in the ground to find their food. They are also capable of eating fruit. While the streaked tenrec does eat earthworms, the dirt may corrode their teeth with scratches and pits.

Reproduction
Breeding takes place during October to December and possibly at other times, depending upon local food supply and temperature. The gestation period lasts 58 days, and the female gives birth to usually between 5 and 8 young. The young are weaned at 18 to 25 days. These tenrecs on average retain the ability to conceive at about 35 days. They have the ability to reproduce during the same season they were produced.

Shelter
The streaked tenrec lives in long, shallow burrows which are usually occupied by family groups.

Spines as tools
H. semispinosus has hard keratinous quills located in the mid-dorsal region that act as a sounding device and are thought to be used for communication between mother and young and/or a warning signal to predators. Movement of these quills causes the tips to rub together and create a high frequency sound. These quills are located in a small area of the mid-dorsal region in a group of seven to sixteen arranged in three rows. Five quills run laterally on each side and is flanked by five to six quills being light brown in color. The arrangement and number of quills does not alter during growth and neither does the length. The circumference of the quills however, does change from juvenile to adult.

When an individual is aggravated a defense response is produced by erecting its quills laterally and forward which produces sound when the quills vibrate. H. semispinosus has a highly developed sense of smell and this response along with foot stamping is also produced when the odor of a predator is detected. This display additionally occurs when males fight for females and when unfamiliar males come across one another. Female encounters however, have tactile contact and then increase the distance between each other. It uses its quills to communicate in two different ways, by raising them in agitation or by rubbing them together in a method known as stridulation – best known as the type noise produced by crickets and cicadas. The sound produced is too high to be perceived by human ears.

Sound
The streaked tenrec is the only mammal known to use stridulation for generating sound, a method more commonly associated with insects and snakes. Due to its rarity, there is not sufficient information regarding the functional-morphological mechanism of the streaked tenrec. The sounding quills are different from the spines and hair and are found in the mid-dorsal region of the streaked tenrec. The arrangement and length are similar throughout the streaked tenrec's life span, making up three rows in its midline area and adjacent areas bilaterally.
Cutaneous muscles underneath the quills were confirmed and are known as quill vibrator disc; they are around 16.8 mm long and 8.55 mm in width for an adult. These cutaneous muscles were the apparatus that contribute the vibration of the quills and production of sound for communication.

Physiology
The streaked tenrec has an ability to enter torpor seasonally. However, it is dependent on altitude, age, fat stores, and temperature. Torpor for this species generally occurs during June and July and during winter. However, H. semispinosus is a facultative hibernator and will come out of torpor during winter and forage. When foraging the soil and leaf litter is prodded with the tip of the nose until prey is detected. Elongated hands and digit adaptation (digits 2, 3, and 4) are the tenrec's main digging apparatus allowing it to unearth and pull its prey form the earth.

The skull has an elongated rostrum with a slender jaw with small spaced dentition placed more forward in the mouth. This species has zalambdodont molars with a dental formula of I 3/3, C 1/1, P 3/3, M 3/3 having a total of 40 teeth. The sagittal crest and nuchal are less prominent in this species and the zygomatic processes are long and slender resulting in less projection from the sides of the skull. The occipital region in this species along with the visceral skeleton are commonly very conservative.

References

External links
ARKive - images and movies of the lowland streaked tenrec (Hemicentetes semispinosus)
iNaturalist page

Afrosoricida
Mammals of Madagascar
Endemic fauna of Madagascar
Mammals described in 1798
Taxa named by Georges Cuvier